Pancake Summit is a gap in White Pine County, Nevada, in the United States.

The name is likely descriptive, referring to its resemblance to a stack of pancakes.

References

Landforms of White Pine County, Nevada